The Gaysin uezd was one of the uezds (uyezds or subdivisions) of the Podolian Governorate of the Russian Empire. It was situated in the southeastern part of the governorate. Its administrative centre was Haisyn (Gaysin).

Demographics
At the time of the Russian Empire Census of 1897, Gaysinsky Uyezd had a population of 248,142. Of these, 86.3% spoke Ukrainian, 10.4% Yiddish, 1.9% Russian, 1.2% Polish and 0.1% German as their native language.

References

 
Uezds of Podolia Governorate